François Le Fort was a merchant and navigator from Vitré, Ille-et-Vilaine, Kingdom of France. In the 16th century, he was a member of the city council of Antwerp, as the member representing the Barber's Guild.

External links
François Le Fort 

French businesspeople
16th-century French people
People of the Habsburg Netherlands
Year of death missing
Year of birth missing